Mastax tessmanni is a species of beetle in the family Carabidae found in Cameroon, Chade, Democratic Republic of the Congo and Uganda. It was described by Liebke in 1934.

References

Mastax tessmanni
Beetles of Africa
Beetles described in 1934